Stenalia merkli is a beetle in the genus Stenalia of the family Mordellidae. It was described in 1895 by Schilsky.

References

merkli
Beetles described in 1895